The Roglai language is a Chamic language of southern Vietnam, spoken by the Raglai people.

There are four Roglai dialects: Northern, Du Long, Southern and Cac Gia.

Their autonym is radlai, which means "forest people".

Swadesh list
Mainland Chamic and Malay comparative table:

References

Languages of Vietnam
Chamic languages